Anthony Hugh Chivers (1920-2015) was a male athlete who competed for England.

Athletics career
He represented England and won a bronze medal in the 3 miles at the 1950 British Empire Games in Auckland, New Zealand. He also competed in the 6 miles race.

References

1920 births
2015 deaths
English male long-distance runners
Athletes (track and field) at the 1950 British Empire Games
Commonwealth Games medallists in athletics
Commonwealth Games bronze medallists for England
Medallists at the 1950 British Empire Games